Young's Ferry was a settlement in Klamath County on the Klamath River down stream from Weitchpec and McDonald's Ferry. On May 19, 1855, it was described by the Weekly Humboldt Times as being on the upstream boundary of the proposed Klamath River Indian Reservation, that was to be along the Klamath River from there to the Pacific Ocean.  The site is now within Humboldt County.

References

Settlements formerly in Klamath County, California
Former settlements in Humboldt County, California